Aurèle is a given name. Notable people with the name include:

Aurèle Audet, politician in Quebec, Canada and a Member of the National Assembly of Quebec
Aurèle Cardinal, Quebec architect, urban planner and academic
Aurèle Chartrand (born 1903), Ontario barrister and political figure
Aurèle Gervais (born 1933), Canadian former politician
Aurèle Joliat (1901–1986), Canadian professional ice hockey left winger
Aurèle Lacombe, politician in Quebec, Canada and a Member of the Legislative Assembly of Quebec
Aurèle Nicolet (born 1926), Swiss flautist
Aurèle Vandendriessche (born 1932), retired marathon runner from Belgium
Joseph-Aurèle Plourde, OC (born 1915), the Canadian Archbishop Emeritus of Ottawa
Juste-Aurèle Meissonnier (1695–1750), French goldsmith, sculptor, painter, architect, and furniture designer
Marc-Aurèle de Foy Suzor-Coté (1869–1937), Canadian painter and sculptor
Marc-Aurèle Fortin (1888–1970), Québécois painter
Pierre-Aurèle Asselin (1881–1964), French Canadian furrier and tenor singer

See also
Marc-Aurèle-Fortin (electoral district), federal electoral district in Quebec, Canada

French masculine given names